C. V. Madhukar is an Indian banker who was most recently Managing Director at Omidyar Network. He was the global lead for their work on Digital Identity. He has been the founder and director of PRS Legislative Research. This research institution focuses on making the legislative process in India better informed, more transparent, and participatory.  PRS publishes "Legislative Briefs" (short commented summaries) of Bills in Lok Sabha and Rajya Sabha and other articles about the work of the Indian parliament.

Prior to this, Madhukar had worked at the World Bank in Washington, D.C., with a group focused on building parliamentary capacities in various countries.

Madhukar started his professional career in 1993 as an investment banker with ICICI Securities and Finance Company in Mumbai, where he worked on the disinvestment of large public sector enterprises. Being an employee of ICICI, he spent significant time as a volunteer and made various contributions to the growth of Pratham in its formative years; now a sizable not-for-profit organization focused on primary education in India: CV Madhukar was part of the original Executive Group of Pratham in Mumbai.

At the invitation of the Government of Karnataka in early 2000, he co-founded and managed the Akshara Foundation, an essential education initiative focussed on Bengaluru's children. He concurrently helped set up the Azim Premji Foundation, an initiative of Azim Premji, Chairman of Wipro, and one of the wealthiest corporate leaders in India. The initiative supports technology in rural schools in India.

Madhukar was an Edward S. Mason Fellow at Harvard University, where he earned a Master’s in Public Administration degree from the John F. Kennedy School of Government.  He also has an MBA (Finance) from the University of Houston and a Bachelor of Engineering (Civil) degree from Bangalore University. Madhukar is an Echoing Green Fellow, Ashoka Fellow, and Eisenhower Fellow.

In March 2008, Madhukar was one of the Indians to be named a Young Global Leader by the World Economic Forum. According to the WEF Press Release, "this honour is bestowed each year by the World Economic Forum to recognize and acknowledge the top 200–300 young leaders from around the world for their professional accomplishments, commitment to society, and potential to contribute to shaping the future of the world."

List of publications by C. V. Madhukar
Privacy in Cyberspace
The Technology Imperative
Be Law Makers Again
Lazing About the House
Ring in the New
Where the Women Are
Is this why we sent them to Parliament?
Do We Need a Judges Inquiry Bill?
Anybody in the House?
No Debate Please, We're MPs
Was the Call for a Bipolar Polity Right?
PM Within the Purview of Lokayukta?
House This for Debate?

References

External links
homepage of PRS Legislative Research
homepage of the Akshara Foundation
self-description of the World Bank Institute’s Parliamentary Strengthening Program on the World Bank homepage
homepage of the Azim Premji Foundation

Articles:
 Anybody in the House? The Indian Express, 11 August 2007
 No debate please, we’re MPs The Indian Express, 21 May 2007
 Was the call for a bipolar polity right? The Economic Times, 16 May 2007
 PM within the purview of Lokayukta? The Economic Times, 16 February 2007
 House this for debate The Indian Express, 3 January 2007
 Fundamental Right to Learning in: Pratham Resource Centre 2007:Learning to read, ASER Discussion Series – Volume 2, page 30

Indian bankers
1968 births
Harvard Kennedy School alumni
Living people
Mason Fellows
Ashoka India Fellows